The India national cricket team toured the West Indies during the 1952–53 cricket season. They played five Test matches against the West Indian cricket team, with the West Indies winning the series 1–0.

Test matches

1st Test

2nd Test

3rd Test

4th Test

5th Test

External links
 India in West Indies, 1952-53 at ESPNcricinfo archive
 "Sailing by banana boat to face the Three Ws" by G.S. Ramchand at ESPNcricinfo
 India to West Indies 1952-53 at test-cricket-tours.co.uk

Further reading
 "India in West Indies, 1953", Wisden 1954, pp. 820–34

1953 in Indian cricket
1953 in West Indian cricket
Indian cricket tours of the West Indies
International cricket competitions from 1945–46 to 1960
West Indian cricket seasons from 1945–46 to 1969–70